Kathleen Sloan is an American violinist based in Los Angeles, CA and a member of the Sonus Quartet.

Early life
Sloan grew up in a ranching family in Breckenridge, TX. At 15, Sloan left home and enrolled in the Young Artist Program at the Cleveland Institute of Music, where she completed high school while beginning her Bachelor of Music at the Cleveland Institute of Music under the tutelage of David Cerone. She later graduated magna cum laude from the University of Southern California

Career
Sloan was a member of the Houston Grand Opera and Houston Ballet Orchestra from 2004 to 2009, and joined the Los Angeles based Sonus Quartet in 2008. She also served as Concertmaster for the Abilene Philharmonic for two seasons.

Notes

External links 
 Sonus Quartet official website 

Living people
American violinists
University of Southern California alumni
Cleveland Institute of Music alumni
People from Breckenridge, Texas
21st-century violinists
Year of birth missing (living people)